The 2019 Andorran local elections were held on 15 December, to elect all councillors in the seven parishes of Andorra.

Electoral system 
Voters elected the members of the municipal councils (consells de comú in Catalan). The Electoral Law allows the municipal councils to choose their numbers of seats, which must be an even number between 10 and 16.

All city council members were elected in single multi-member districts, consisting of the whole parish, using closed lists. Half of the seats were allocated to the party with the most votes. The other half of the seats were allocated using the Hare quota (including the winning party). With this system the winning party obtained an absolute majority.

The cònsol major (mayor) and the cònsol menor (deputy mayor) will be elected indirectly by the municipal councillors after the election.

Parties and leaders 
A total of 21 lists were contesting the election. In Encamp, Ordino and Escaldes-Engordany there were 4 candidacies; in Andorra la Vella and Sant Julià de Lòria, 3; in Canillo, 2; and in la Massana only one list was contesting the election. For first time since the 2007 election, two lists were contesting the election in Canillo. In Sant Julià de Lòria, the incumbent mayor was unable to form a candidacy.

Results 

Final turnout was 56.54%, four percentage points lower than in the 2015 election. Abstention was over 50% in Andorra la Vella.

Candidacies supported by Democrats for Andorra won the election in five out of seven parishes, while in Sant Julià de Lòria, the candidacy formed by Third Way and Lauredian Union won. The Social Democrats won in Escaldes-Engordany.

Canillo

Encamp

Ordino

La Massana

Andorra la Vella

Sant Julià de Lòria

Escaldes-Engordany

References

External links 

 Official website
 List of candidacies
Official results 

Local elections in Andorra
Local elections
Andorran_local_elections
Andorran_local_elections